The Microsoft Lumia 640 and Microsoft Lumia 640 XL are Windows Phone smartphones developed by Microsoft Mobile. Both phones were announced on March 2, 2015, and are the successors to the Nokia Lumia 630 series and the Lumia 1320, respectively. The phones are primarily aimed at developing markets, although they are also available in developed markets as lower-cost options compared to other phones in their classes. The two devices became available in the US and most other markets in June 2015.

On February 15, 2016, Microsoft announced the Lumia 650, the Lumia 640 successor, with improvements like device encryption, an AMOLED display, and 16 GB of flash storage.

On October 18, 2017, Microsoft confirmed that the phone will not receive more major Windows updates, but it will still get security updates and cumulative updates until 2025

Release and availability 
The Lumia 640 and 640 XL were unveiled at Microsoft's event at the Mobile World Congress in Barcelona, Spain on March 2, 2015. 

The Lumia 640 LTE has U.S. pricing beginning at US$ 179.99, while the Lumia 640 XL LTE (exclusive to AT&T in the country) is priced at US$ 249.99.

Both phones are available as Dual-SIM and LTE worldwide from April 2015.

In certain countries, there is promotion which includes a 16GB or 32GB SD Memory Card for purchasing Lumia 640 and 640 XL.

Hardware 
Despite similar names and model codes, the Microsoft Lumia 640 and Microsoft Lumia 640 XL are distinct devices in both form and function.

The Lumia 640 comes with a 5-inch HD IPS LCD display with Corning Gorilla Glass 3 protection and oleophobic (fingerprint-resistant) coating. It is powered by a 1.2 GHz quad-core Qualcomm Snapdragon 400 processor, 1 GB RAM and 8 GB (only 3 GB available) internal storage with up to 128GB expandable storage via microSD cards. It has a 2500 mAh Li-Ion battery, 8 MP rear camera with LED flash, and 0.9 MP wide-angle front-facing camera. It is available in glossy cyan, orange, and white, along with matte-texture black.

The Microsoft Lumia 640 XL is the larger, "phablet"-type version of the Lumia 640, with a 5.7-inch HD IPS LCD display. The 640 XL is equipped with the same basic hardware and network connectivity specifications as the Lumia 640, but features a Zeiss-engineered 13 MP (1/3.0″ sensor) rear camera with LED flash, as well as a 5MP wide-angle front-facing camera. It has a 3000 mAh Li-Ion battery and is available in matte-texture cyan, orange, and black, along with glossy & matte-texture white.

Software 
The Lumia 640 and Lumia 640 XL shipped with Windows Phone 8.1 Update 2 (through the Lumia Denim software package), and both phones are upgradable to Windows 10 Mobile. Initially in the United States, the Lumia 640 and 640 XL were offered with a free one-year subscription to Microsoft Office 365.

Carriers 

Australia
 Telstra (Lumia 640 and 640 XL)

United StatesRM-
 AT&T (Lumia 640 and 640 XL)
 Cricket Wireless (Lumia 640 only)
 MetroPCS (Lumia 640 only)
 T-Mobile (Lumia 640 only)

Models 
Lumia 640 models

Lumia 640XL models

See also 
 Microsoft Lumia
 Nokia Lumia 630
 Nokia Lumia 1320
 Microsoft Lumia 650

References 

Microsoft Lumia
Mobile phones introduced in 2015
Discontinued smartphones
Windows Phone devices
Microsoft hardware
Mobile phones with user-replaceable battery